Alatuncusia canalis is a moth in the family Crambidae. It is found on Hispaniola.

References

Moths described in 1866
Dichogamini
Moths of the Caribbean